USS Van Buren has been the name of two ships in the United States Navy.  The first ship was named after President Martin Van Buren, while the second was named after the city of Van Buren, Arkansas.

 , a schooner-rigged revenue cutter

See also

References

United States Navy ship names